Lakemont is an unincorporated community in Rabun County, Georgia, United States, located in a mountainous area between U.S. Route 23/441 and Lake Rabun. Lakemont has a post office with ZIP code 30552.

A post office named Lakemont was established in 1914. The community was so named on account of its elevated location near Lake Rabun.

References

External links
Historic Lakemont Village

Unincorporated communities in Rabun County, Georgia
Unincorporated communities in Georgia (U.S. state)